Predrag Filipović (Serbian Cyrillic: Предраг Филиповић, born 12 January 1975 in Titograd) is a Montenegrin retired footballer who last played for Eendracht Aalst.

Club career
He left Dutch Eredivisie club Roda JC for Lokeren in January 2006. In July 2007, he moved from SC Lokeren to Dender and was transferred in January 2009 back to Eendracht Aalst, his first club in Belgium.

Filipović also holds Belgian nationality. During the 1990s he played in First League of FR Yugoslavia clubs FK Proleter Zrenjanin and FK Obilić. He worked as a mailman in Belgium after retiring as a player.

Honours
Obilić Belgrade
1 time First League of FR Yugoslavia Champion: 1997-98

References

External links
 
 
 Profile & stats - Lokeren

1975 births
Living people
Footballers from Podgorica
Association football fullbacks
Serbia and Montenegro footballers
Serbia and Montenegro under-21 international footballers
Montenegrin footballers
Belgian footballers
FK Proleter Zrenjanin players
FK Obilić players
S.C. Eendracht Aalst players
K.F.C. Lommel S.K. players
Roda JC Kerkrade players
K.S.C. Lokeren Oost-Vlaanderen players
F.C.V. Dender E.H. players
First League of Serbia and Montenegro players
Belgian Pro League players
Eredivisie players
Belgian Third Division players
Challenger Pro League players
Serbia and Montenegro expatriate footballers
Expatriate footballers in Belgium
Serbia and Montenegro expatriate sportspeople in Belgium
Expatriate footballers in the Netherlands
Serbia and Montenegro expatriate sportspeople in the Netherlands
Montenegrin expatriate footballers
Montenegrin expatriate sportspeople in Belgium